Tizqar of Kish was the nineteenth Sumerian king in the First Dynasty of Kish and succeeded his father Zamuq as a ruler, according to some versions of the Sumerian King List. His name does not appear in Early Dynastic inscriptions, meaning that he is unlikely to have been a real historical person.

References 

|-

29th-century BC Sumerian kings
Kings of Kish
Sumerian kings